Hyllie is an area and former city district in the central of Malmö Municipality, Sweden. On 1 July 2013, it was merged with Limhamn-Bunkeflo, forming Väster. In 2012, Hyllie had a population of 32,998 of the municipality's 307,758. The area was 901 hectares. Though the name of the district has changed the area is still referred to as Hyllie.

Neighbourhoods
The neighbourhoods of Hyllie were:

Notable people
Anthony Elanga, footballer for Manchester United, son of Cameroonian footballer Joseph Elanga

References

Former city districts of Malmö